Ngarahu Katene is a Māori Anglican bishop: he has been the incumbent of the Episcopal polity of Te Pīhopatanga o Te Manawa o Te Wheke since 2005.

References

Living people
New Zealand Māori religious leaders
21st-century Anglican bishops in New Zealand
Year of birth missing (living people)
Anglican bishops of Te Manawa o Te Wheke